Rahimpur Bishdhan is a village in Bilhaur Tehsil, Kanpur Nagar district, Uttar Pradesh, India. It is located 70 kilometers away from Kanpur Central railway station.

References

Villages in Kanpur Nagar district